Edward Jurkiewicz (born 22 January 1948 in Pruszcz Gdański, Poland) is a Polish former professional basketball player. During his playing career, he was a 1.95 m tall (6' 4") tall small forward. He was a member of the senior Polish national team.

Professional career
Jurkiewicz was a member of the FIBA European Selection, in 1971.

National team career
Jurkiewicz was a member of the senior Polish national team. He was named to the 1969 EuroBasket's All-Tournament Team. He led the 1971 EuroBasket in scoring, averaging 22.6 points per game. His performance at the tournament earned him another selection to the All-Tournament Team. He also competed at the men's tournament at the 1968 Summer Olympics.

References

External links
FIBA Profile
FIBA Europe Profile

1948 births
Living people
Basketball players at the 1968 Summer Olympics
Olympic basketball players of Poland
People from Pruszcz Gdański
Polish men's basketball players
Small forwards
Sportspeople from Pomeranian Voivodeship